The withdrawal of a country's lowest-denomination coins from circulation (usually a one-cent coin or equivalent) may either be through a decision to remove the coins from circulation, or simply through ceasing minting.

Reasons
This withdrawal may be due to the high cost of production, since the coin may be worth less than its cost of production. For example, when Canada phased out its penny in 2012, its production cost was 1.6 cents per penny.
Other reasons include low purchasing power and low utility. Often coins are withdrawn after their purchasing power has been eroded after decades of inflation. In Switzerland, the 1 Rappen coin had fallen into disuse by the early 1980s, but was still produced until 2006, albeit in ever decreasing quantities. Conversely, the British Treasury department initially argued for the retention of the decimal halfpenny, on the grounds that its withdrawal would drive up inflation.

In some countries, such as New Zealand, withdrawn coins are declared to be no longer legal tender; in other countries, such as Australia, they remain legal tender indefinitely.

When the coin in question is no longer minted, cash transactions are rounded, typically through Swedish rounding.

Efforts have been made to end the routine use of pennies, and equivalents thereof, in several more countries, including the United States. Countries in the Eurozone have had different responses to the issue; according to James Debono writing for Malta Today, "scrapping the coins is considered unthinkable for Germany where both consumers and retailers are obsessed with precise pricing."

Countries

Countries that have withdrawn their lowest-denomination coins include:

See also
Cent (currency)
Penny
Legal tender#Demonetization

References

Discontinued products
History of money
Lists of coins